Pseudospirocyclina is  a genus of large planispirally coiled agglutinated benthic forams with a complex interior known from the upper Jurassic (Kimmeridgian) of Portugal and Morocco.

As Foraminifera, Pseudospirocyclina are biologically, granuloreticulose Sarcodina, retariate rhizarian, there for a protozoan. As a member of the Spirocyclinidae the genus is related to genera like Spirocyclina, Sornayina, and Spiraloconulus

References 

Loftusiida
Prehistoric Foraminifera genera